Osterman and Siebert was an architectural firm in Walla Walla, Washington. Henry Osterman was senior partner.

Osterman was born in Essen, Germany in 1862 The firm's work included Dixie High School and Liberty Theater. Henry Osterman is credited with designing the Electric Light Works Building, Green Park School and Walla Walla Public Library. Outside of Walla Walla the firm designed Preston Hall.

Work credited to Henry Osterman and his firm
 Dixie School (1921)
Walla Walla Armory (1920)
 Courty Courthouse (1916)
 Preston Hall (1913) in Waitsburg
 Ellis Hotel
 Siel Building
  Walla Walla High School & Gym
 Central Fire Station
 Jefferson School
 City Hall
 YMCA Building
 Green Park School
 Sharpstein School
 Prospect Point School
 Masonic Temple
 Carnegie Library (1905)
 Central Christian Church
 Phi Delta Theta House (Whitman College)

See also
National Register of Historic Places listings in Walla Walla County, Washington
Osterman House

References

1862 births
Year of death missing
German emigrants to the United States
Architects from Washington (state)